Selenols are organic compounds that contain the functional group with the connectivity C–Se–H. Selenols are sometimes also called selenomercaptans and selenothiols.  Selenols are one of the principal classes of organoselenium compounds. The best known member of the group is the amino acid selenocysteine.

Structure, bonding, properties
Selenols are structurally similar to thiols, but the C-Se bond is about 8% longer at 196 pm. The C–Se–H angle approaches 90°. The bonding involves almost pure p-orbitals on Se, hence the near 90 angles. The Se–H bond energy is weaker than the S–H bond, consequently selenols are easily oxidized and serve as H-atom donors. The Se-H bond is much weaker than the S-H bond as reflected in their respective bond dissociation energy (BDE). For C6H5Se-H, the BDE is 326 kJ/mol, while for C6H5S-H, the BDE is 368 kJ/mol.

Selenol acids are about 1000 times stronger than thiols: the pKa of CH3SeH is 5.2 vs 8.3 for CH3SH. Deprotonation affords the selenolate anion, RSe−, most examples of which are highly nucleophilic and rapidly oxidized by air.

The boiling points of selenols tend to be slightly greater than for thiols. This can be attributed to the increased importance of stronger van der Waals bonding for larger atoms. Volatile selenols have highly offensive odors.

Applications and occurrence

Selenols have few commercial applications, being limited by the high toxicity of selenium as well as the sensitivity of the Se–H bond. Their conjugate bases, the selenolates, do have limited applications in organic synthesis.

Biochemical role
Selenols are important in certain biological processes. Three enzymes found in mammals contain selenols at their active sites: glutathione peroxidase, iodothyronine deiodinase, and thioredoxin reductase. The selenols in these proteins are part of the essential amino acid selenocysteine. The selenols function as reducing agents to give selenenic acid derivative (RSe–OH), which in turn are re-reduced by thiol-containing enzymes.   Methaneselenol (commonly named "methylselenol") (CH3SeH), which can be produced in vitro by incubating selenomethionine with a bacterial methionine gamma-lyase (METase) enzyme, by biological methylation of selenide ion or in vivo by reduction of methaneseleninic acid (CH3SeO2H), has been invoked to explain the anticancer activity of certain organoselenium compounds. Precursors of methaneselenol are under active investigation in cancer prevention and therapy. In these studies, methaneselenol is found to be more biologically active than ethaneselenol or 2-propaneselenol.

Preparation
Selenols are usually prepared by the reaction of organolithium reagents or Grignard reagents with elemental Se. For example, benzeneselenol is generated by the reaction of phenylmagnesium bromide with selenium followed by acidicifation:

Another preparative route to selenols involves the alkylation of selenourea, followed by hydrolysis. Selenols are often generated by reduction of diselenides followed by protonation of the resulting selenoate:
2 RSeSeR  +  2 LiHB(C2H5)3   →   2 RSeLi  +  2 B(C2H5)3  +  H2
RSeLi  +  HCl   →   RSeH  +  LiCl

Dimethyl diselenide can be easily reduced to methaneselenol within cells.

Reactions
Selenols are easily oxidized to diselenides, compounds containing an Se-Se bond. For example, treatment of benzeneselenol with bromine gives diphenyl diselenide.
2 C6H5SeH  +  Br2   →   (C6H5Se)2  +  2 HBr
In the presence of base, selenols are readily alkylated to give selenides.  This relationship is illustrated by the methylation of methaneselenol to give dimethylselenide.

Safety
Organoselenium compounds (or any selenium compound) are cumulative poisons despite the fact that trace amounts of Se are required for health.

See also
 Alcohol
 Thiol

References

Functional groups
Selenols